Tabajara were one of the Tupi tribes of indigenous people who lived on the easternmost portion of the Atlantic coast of northeast Brazil in the period before and during Portuguese colonization. Their territory included portions of the modern states of Ceara, Paraiba, Rio Grande do Norte, and Pernambuco. The name means ''lord of the village'' from Tupi-Guarani taba village, and jara lord.

During the colonial period, populations of Indians, Tabajara among them, were decimated by being slaughtered by the colonists, driven inland, enslaved, dying of European introduced diseases and by intermarrying.

They currently live in the regions of Poranga, Monsenhor Tabosa, Tamboril, Crateús and Quiterianópolis and in the backcountry of Ceará.

History
The Tabajara were allies of the French during their occupation of Maranhão Island (now the city and island of São Luis) in 1612-1615

Further reading
 de Alencar, J. (2000) Iracema. Oxford University Press 

Indigenous peoples in Brazil
Indigenous peoples of Eastern Brazil